Ida Kristina Sand (born 5 November 1977) is a Swedish jazz singer and pianist.

Ida Sand was born in Stockholm, and studied music at Högskolan för scen och musik in University of Gothenburg. She debuted as a guest artist at Nils Landgrens Christmas with My Friends in 2006 releasing her solo debut album  Meet Me Around Midnight in 2007. She is signed to ACT label. Sand is married to guitar player Ola Gustafsson. Ida Sand is the daughter of Staffan Sandlund, an opera singer.

Discography

Albums

References

External links
Ida Sand page on ACT website

Swedish jazz singers
1977 births
Singers from Stockholm
Living people
21st-century Swedish women singers
ACT Music artists